CIX can refer to:

CIX (website), an online conferencing system.
FAP Captain José Abelardo Quiñones González International Airport, an airport in Peru
Commercial Internet eXchange, a forerunner of the commercial Internet in the US
109 (disambiguation) in Roman numerals
CIX (band), a South Korean boy group